Vinayagamoorthy Muralitharan (nom de guerre: Colonel Karuna Amman; , Vināyakamūrtti Muraḷitaraņ, born 22 June 1966) is a Sri Lankan politician and former militant. Formerly a fighter for the Tamil separatist group, the Liberation Tigers of Tamil Eelam (LTTE), for over 20 years, Muralitharan later rose to prominence after defecting from the LTTE and forming the Tamil Makkal Viduthalai Pulikal (TMVP), a breakaway faction of the LTTE.

After giving up arms and entering politics, he was appointed as a National List Member of Parliament in 2008 for the ruling United People's Freedom Alliance (UPFA), the party of former President Mahinda Rajapaksa, and was sworn in as Minister of National Integration on 9 March, 2009. He later joined the Sri Lanka Freedom Party (SLFP), the main constituent party of the UPFA, and on 24 April 2009 he was appointed as a Vice President of the SLFP.

Militant life 

Muralitharan was born in Kiran, a village in the Batticaloa district in eastern Sri Lanka to Vinayagamoorthy, an agriculturist from the Vaisyas Caste (Farming and Business Community). He joined the LTTE in 1983 and became a top commander in the Eastern Province. He was formerly a bodyguard to LTTE leader Velupillai Prabhakaran.

Breakaway from the LTTE 
On 26 July 2004, Karuna broke away from the Tamil Tigers after he alleged they were ignoring the interests of the eastern Tamil people, and claimed to have renounced violence. The move by Karuna to break away from the LTTE and renounce armed struggle was considered one of the major turning points of the Sri Lankan Civil War that would eventually bring about the end of the 25 year-long conflict. Muralitharan joined forces with the Sri Lanka Armed Forces to capture LTTE bases. Former Deputy Minister Seyed Ali Zahir Moulana has been hailed as being instrumental in convincing Karuna to renounce militarism, who in turn joined the democratic mainstream.

The LTTE claimed that the real reason for Karuna's defection was because the LTTE's intelligence wing was closing in on him for alleged financial and personal misconduct, terming his break a "temporary aberration". The Tigers reacted to his defection by launching attacks against Muralitharan's forces, and heavy clashes ensued. They claimed to have fully evicted his forces from the area he controlled by mid-2004.

However Karuna's group, dubbed the Karuna Faction by the media, continued to maintain a stronghold in the southeast of Sri Lanka with a force estimated to number a few hundred. The group regularly got into clashes with the LTTE. In 2006, the Sri Lankan Armed Forces launched a major campaign to evict the LTTE from the east of the country, with the assistance of the Karuna Faction. Together the coalition succeeded in clearing the east of Sri Lanka by July 2007.

Karuna has alleged that Prabhakaran intentionally dragged out peace talks with Sri Lanka to give rebels additional time to re-arm for further combat. He said that the LTTE lost about 70% of its fighting capacity due the TMVP separating from the LTTE.

In March 2007, Colonel Karuna, accompanied by Supreme Commander Pillaiyan, Senior Commander Jeyam and other TVMP officials spent two days at a TMVP base in the east. A number of his statements there were widely reported.

At the same time, the TMVP announced that it was setting up a "special attack force" and a "spy attack force". Internal cohesion within the TMVP has been a problem in the past before, particularly disagreements between Pillaiyan and Karuna over finance. Between May–June, a number of cadres were killed in inter-factional clashes, most notably an intelligence operative named Senthujan Senthamorthanan. Another TMVP cadre named Seelan was also badly beaten but luckily escaped. Pillaiyan was reportedly targeted as well but escaped to Trincomalee with about 200 supporters, although he has since reconciled with Karuna.

Allegations of human rights violations 
Colonel Karuna was the LTTE head of the Eastern Province in 1990 when 600 unarmed police officers who surrendered to the group were subsequently massacred.

When Colonel Karuna was part of the LTTE, he was also involved in the massacre of Muslims, including the Kattankudy and Eravur massacres in the Eastern Province.

RSF (Reporters Without Borders) has accused him of muzzling local journalists by forming death squads to silence those who oppose his views.

His armed groups have been blamed for the increasing involuntary disappearances of civilians in the Jaffna peninsula by several human rights groups. They have also been accused of taking part in death squad activity against civilians. Additionally, they are also accused of child soldier recruitment by UNICEF, Human Rights Watch, and others.  A report by the United States Department of State claims that Karuna's group "was believed also to have killed 20 civilians."

Karuna has categorically denied these allegations in interviews, claiming the LTTE is trying to discredit his party.

Imprisonment in the United Kingdom 
Karuna was arrested in London on 2 November 2007, following a joint operation between the Metropolitan Police and the Border and Immigration Agency. It is thought that Karuna was found in possession of a forged passport and firearms. According to the Sunday Times, a weekly English newspaper published in Sri Lanka, the British authorities claimed that they had enough evidence to show that the Sri Lankan government was complicit in helping Karuna receive a diplomatic passport.

Karuna confessed in court that the government, through permanent Secretary of Defense Gotabaya Rajapaksa, had given him the passport. On 25 January 2008, he was sentenced to nine months in prison. He was transferred to an immigration detention centre in May 2008.

A number of human rights groups, led by Amnesty International, urged the Metropolitan Police to investigate Karuna for war crimes including torture, hostage-taking and recruitment of child soldiers. The Met Police did not respond and Karuna returned to Sri Lanka on 3 July, 2008.

Political career 
Upon his return to Sri Lanka, Karuna entered democratic politics and joined the SLFP alongside 1750 other ex-LTTE members. Karuna praised then-incumbent president Mahinda Rajapaksa, claiming that the Black July riots would not have happened if Rajapaksa was in power during the period. Karuna was then sworn in as Minister of National Integration.

COVID-19 speech controversy 
On 19 June 2020, Karuna made a publicity stunt by making a revelation that he was even cruel and merciless than the COVID-19 virus saying "I am dangerous than coronavirus. Corona killed 11 people but I killed 2000-3000 soldiers within one day." He stated that he killed more than 3000 soldiers at the Elephant Pass during the war and claimed that he was more dangerous than the COVID-19 related fatalities in the country. His insensible comments drew widespread criticism from political fraternity calling him a barbarian and he was summoned to appear before the Criminal Investigation Department to record statements according to the order by acting DGP C. D. Wickramaratne.

Karuna later claimed that his speech was edited by the media and that he never made such comments. The UN Human Rights Commission called upon the government to start further investigations regarding Karuna's former alleged war crimes, however, the Karuna and the TMVP were close allies with the SLPP, the ruling party, which defended Karuna.

Karuna went through few trials by the courts. Several groups brought evidence of massacres he is said to have caused. Karuna called the incident a plot by the UNP, a prominent opposition party, to destroy the reputation of the TMVP and the Sri Lanka People's Freedom Alliance.

Further reading

See also
 Militant use of children in Sri Lanka

References

External links
 Renegade sworn in as S Lanka MP
 Official Party Website 
 Voice of East
 BBC interview with Karuna 4 March 2007
 Interview with Karuna, Asian Tribune
 BBC profile of Colonel Karuna, BBC News, March 5, 2004. Retrieved April 6, 2007
 "US slams police, Karuna, LTTE", BBC News, 10 March 2006. Retrieved 6 April 2007
 "A documentary about Col. Karuna", Video Documentary about Col. Karuna

1966 births
Government ministers of Sri Lanka
Liberation Tigers of Tamil Eelam members
Living people
Members of the 13th Parliament of Sri Lanka
Members of the 14th Parliament of Sri Lanka
People from Eastern Province, Sri Lanka
Sri Lanka Freedom Party politicians
Sri Lankan Hindus
Sri Lankan Tamil politicians
Sri Lankan Tamil rebels
Tamil Makkal Viduthalai Pulikal politicians
United People's Freedom Alliance politicians